The Samsung World Championship was an annual golf tournament played between 1980 and 2009, for professional female golfers on the LPGA Tour.  It was a limited field event, open by invitation only.

The tournament was founded in 1980 by Mark McCormack, founder of the sports management firm IMG,  originally with the world's top-12 LPGA players. The field was increased to 16 players in 1996 and to 20 in 1999. Electronics manufacturer Samsung became the title sponsor in 1995.

Tournament names through the years:
1980: World Series of Women's Golf
1981: World Championship of Women's Golf
1982-1984: Chevrolet World Championship of Women's Golf
1985: Nestle World Championship of Women's Golf
1986-1989: Nestle World Championship
1990: Trophee Urban-World Championship
1991: Daikyo World Championship
1992: no tournament
1993-1994: World Championship of Women's Golf
1995-1999: Samsung World Championship of Women's Golf
2000-2009: Samsung World Championship

2009 participants
The 2009 championship included 20 players: the previous year's defending champion; the 2008 Vare Trophy winner; the 2008 LPGA Money Winner; the winners of the four 2009 women's major golf championships: the Kraft Nabisco Championship, McDonald's LPGA Championship, U.S. Women's Open, and Women's British Open; the leading player from the Ladies European Tour in 2009; one sponsor's exemption selected by the championship selection committee; the leading "active" LPGA Hall of Fame member on the LPGA Official Money List in 2009; and the top money winners on the LPGA Tour from the 2009 season.

The 2009 participants listed in order of qualification or invitation:
Paula Creamer - Defending Champion
Lorena Ochoa - 2008 Vare Trophy Winner, 2008 LPGA Money Leader
Brittany Lincicome - Winner of 2009 Kraft Nabisco Championship
Anna Nordqvist - Winner of 2009 LPGA Championship
Eun-Hee Ji - Winner of 2009 U.S. Women's Open
Catriona Matthew - Winner of 2009 Ricoh Women's British Open
Juli Inkster - Sponsor's Exemption
Cristie Kerr - LPGA Money Leader
Sophie Gustafson - LET Order of Merit Leader 
Karrie Webb - Leading Active LPGA Hall of Fame Member
Jiyai Shin - Qualified from LPGA Money List
Ai Miyazato - Qualified from LPGA Money List
In-Kyung Kim - Qualified from LPGA Money List
Yani Tseng - Qualified from LPGA Money List
Suzann Pettersen - Qualified from LPGA Money List
Angela Stanford - Qualified from LPGA Money List
Kristy McPherson - Qualified from LPGA Money List
Na Yeon Choi - Qualified from LPGA Money List
Lindsey Wright - Qualified from LPGA Money List
Song-Hee Kim - Qualified from LPGA Money List

Winners

Tournament records

References

External links
Official website
LPGA official tournament microsite

Former LPGA Tour events
Golf in California
Samsung Sports
Recurring sporting events established in 1980
Recurring sporting events disestablished in 2009
1980 establishments in Ohio
2009 disestablishments in California
World championships in golf
Women's sports in California